Nutrition Assistance Grants are the Federal programs in Puerto Rico and American Samoa that provide food assistance through block grant funds in lieu of food stamps, and to the Northern Marianas under a covenant governing U.S. relations with that jurisdiction.

See also
Food and Nutrition Service
Nutrition Assistance for Puerto Rico

References 

United States Department of Agriculture